"Let Me Go" is a song by American singer Hailee Steinfeld and Swedish record producer Alesso, featuring American country music duo Florida Georgia Line and American singer-songwriter Watt. It was written by Ali Tamposi, Brian Lee, Jamie Lidell, Alesso and Watt, with production handled by the latter two. The song was released through Republic Records on September 8, 2017.

Background
On September 5, 2017, Republic Records confirmed the forthcoming collaboration, and revealed its release and radio airplay date. On September 7, 2017, Steinfeld posted teasers on social media, officially announcing the song's release date.

Composition
"Let Me Go" is a tropical house and pop song, with country influences.

Critical reception
David Rishty of Billboard called the song an "eye-popping collaboration", and felt it "has all the right ingredients for its lyrics to quickly get stuck in your head". Kat Bein of the same publication deemed it "a radio-ready pop ballad", "a feel-good breakup song with pop and country crossover". He opined that it "drips with tropical coconut notes with central vocals from Steinfeld and a strong backup from Florida Georgia Line", and sounds similar to Kygo's 2016 song "Carry Me". Brittany Provost of EDMTunes called it "a surprisingly very catchy and upbeat track". Kelly Brickey of Sounds Like Nashville felt it "bops like the next big club hit with FGL and Steinfeld trading off verses for an up-tempo love song".

Credits and personnel
Credits adapted from Tidal.
 Hailee Steinfeld – vocals
 Alesso – songwriting, production, keyboard, percussion, programming
 Ali Tamposi – songwriting, background vocals
 Andrew Watt – songwriting, production, background vocals, bass, guitar, percussion
 Brian Lee – songwriting, background vocals
 Jamie Lidell – songwriting
 Johannes Raassina – engineering
 Brian Kelley – vocals
 Tyler Hubbard - vocals 
 Serban Ghenea – mixing

Charts

Weekly charts

Year-end charts

Decade-end charts

Certifications

Release history

References

2017 songs
2017 singles
Hailee Steinfeld songs
Alesso songs
Florida Georgia Line songs
Republic Records singles
Songs written by Ali Tamposi
Songs written by Brian Lee (songwriter)
Songs written by Alesso
Songs written by Andrew Watt (record producer)
Song recordings produced by Alesso